is a Japanese drama special, directed by Shintaro Sugawara, part of Nippon TV's annual 24 Hour Television: "Love Saves the Earth" telethon. It received a viewership rating of 23.4%.

Plot
Kouta Fujioka is a 29-year old man who has a good family, including his father who always supports him, his mother who enjoys cooking, and his older sister with her bright personality. He also has a girlfriend named Etsuko Tanebe. Kouta wants people to eat delicious foods made by him and begins a job as an apprentice chef at a restaurant. One day, Kouta suddenly passes out and is sent to the hospital, where he is diagnosed with malignant lymphoma, completely changing his life. Given three months left to live, Kouta makes up his mind, with the support of his family and those he meets at the hospital, to accept his fate and "face a proper death".

Cast
 Satoshi Ohno as Kouta Fujioka
 Tomokazu Miura as Kenjirou Fujioka
 Kayoko Kishimoto as Yasuko Fujioka
 Mimura as Koharu Fujioka
 Kyoko Fukada as Yuriko Ohkubo
 Fumino Kimura as Etsuko Tanebe
 Ryosuke Yamada as Harada
 Kyūsaku Shimada as Hiroki Murayama
 Ken Mitsuishi as Tetsuo Machida
 Rio Tanaka as Kouta Fujioka (child)
 Hana Ikeda as Koharu Fujioka (child)

References

External links
 

2013 Japanese television series debuts
Nippon TV dramas
2013 television specials
Japanese television specials